Tyrone Watson (born July 12, 1990) is a Canadian professional basketball player for the St. John's Edge of the National Basketball League of Canada (NBL). He attended New Mexico State University, where he represented the Aggies, and has competed with the Canadian youth national team in the past. Following graduation, Watson played a season with the Halifax Rainmen in the NBL Canada and, following a suspension, returned to the league with the Orangeville A's.

Professional career
Watson was named NBLC Canadian of the Year after the 2014–15 season, but was fined $5,000 and suspended indefinitely "for conduct detrimental to the league," after his team forfeited Game 7 of the 2015 NBL Canada Finals due to a pre-game brawl. In 2014, he was named North of the Border Basketball League (NBBL) Most Valuable Player. The NBBL is the top summer league in Canada.

On October 9, 2015, Watson signed with Al-Muharraq of the Bahraini Premier League. It was his first professional contract with a team outside of Canada. But on March 11, 2016, he was reinstated to the NBL Canada and signed with the Orangeville A's. In his debut on March 11, Watson led the A's to a win over the Windsor Express, posting 18 points and nine rebounds and being named Player of the Game.

Watson averaged 11.6 points, 5.6 rebounds, and 3.8 assists per game for the St. John's Edge during the 2019-20 season. He was named to the NBL Canada All-Canadian First Team.

International career 
In the summer of 2008, Watson competed with the Canadian national team at the FIBA Americas Under-18 Championship. He also played on the international stage in the Nike Global Challenge, leading his team to a bronze medal.

External links 
 Tyrone Watson NMSU bio
 Tyrone Watson at Eurobasket.com

References 

1990 births
Living people
Basketball people from Ontario
Canadian expatriate basketball people in the United States
Canadian men's basketball players
Canadian expatriate basketball people in Bahrain
Forwards (basketball)
Halifax Hurricanes players
Halifax Rainmen players
St. John's Edge players
New Mexico State Aggies men's basketball players
Sportspeople from Hamilton, Ontario